Open is the fourth studio album released by the hard rock band Gotthard.

The album peaked at #1 on the Swiss Charts and was certified as 2× Platinum for exceeding 60,000 sales.

Track listing

Personnel
Steve Lee – vocals 
Leo Leoni – guitars and vocals
Mandy Meyer – guitars
Marc Lynn – bass guitar
Hena Habegger – drums

Guests:
Andy Pupato – percussion
Max Lasser – slide guitar, steel guitar and dobro
H. P. Bruggermann – keyboards, piano and Hammond organ

Production
Mixing – Paul Lani

Charts

Weekly charts

Year-end charts

References

External links
Heavy Harmonies page

Gotthard (band) albums
1999 albums